State Route 225 (SR 225) was a state highway in the U.S. state of California that was a loop route of U.S. Route 101 that served the beach areas of the Santa Barbara area. The route was originally defined in 1963. In 2014, control of the highway was transferred from the state to the city of Santa Barbara. , however, the California State Legislature has neither deleted nor even amended the legal definition of SR 225 in the California Streets and Highways Code since 2011 when they authorized Caltrans to transfer control of the highway to the city.

Route description
SR 225 was a route that closely followed the beaches of the city of Santa Barbara. It started off near the Earl Warren Showgrounds at the junction of U.S. Route 101 and Las Positas Road and headed south towards the coast before turning east on Cliff Drive. It then climbed up a small viaduct before descending near Santa Barbara City College and ended at Castillo Street and US 101.

History
Until 1998, SR 225 followed Cabrillo Boulevard along the beach, ending near Montecito.  On January 30, 2014, Caltrans transferred control of SR 225 to the city of Santa Barbara. , the Route 225 definition still remains listed under Section 525 of the California Streets and Highways Code, including the authorization for Caltrans to transfer control of the highway to Santa Barbara.

Major intersections

See also

References

External links

Caltrans: Route 225 highway conditions
California Highways: Route 225
California @ AARoads.com - State Route 225
SR 225 press release - relinquishment to City of Santa Barbara
225
State Route 225
Santa Barbara, California